The 1976 Tour de France was the 63rd edition of the Tour de France, one of cycling's Grand Tours. The race finished in Paris on 18 July.

Prologue
24 June 1976 – Saint-Jean-de-Monts to Saint-Jean-de-Monts,  (ITT)

Stage 1
25 June 1976 – Saint-Jean-de-Monts to Angers,

Stage 2
26 June 1976 – Angers to Caen,

Stage 3
27 June 1976 – Le Touquet-Paris-Plage to Le Touquet-Paris-Plage,  (ITT)

Stage 4
28 June 1976 – Le Touquet-Paris-Plage to Bornem,

Stage 5a
29 June 1976 – Leuven to Leuven,  (TTT)

Stage 5b
29 June 1976 – Leuven to Verviers,

Stage 6
30 June 1976 – Bastogne to Nancy,

Stage 7
1 July 1976 – Nancy to Mulhouse,

Stage 8
2 July 1976 – Valentigney to Divonne-les-Bains,

Rest day 1
3 July 1976 – Divonne-les-Bains

Stage 9
4 July 1976 – Divonne-les-Bains to Alpe d'Huez,

Stage 10
5 July 1976 – Le Bourg-d'Oisans to Montgenèvre,

Stage 11
6 July 1976 – Montgenèvre to Manosque,

Rest day 2
7 July 1976 – Le Barcarès

Stage 12

References

1976 Tour de France
Tour de France stages